Ek Shola is a 1956 Hindi film starring Pradeep Kumar and Mala Sinha.

Soundtrack

References

External links
 

1956 films
1950s Hindi-language films
Films scored by Madan Mohan
Indian black-and-white films
Indian romantic comedy films
1956 romantic comedy films